A cascading discontinuity set is a term related to Wild Cards and applied in foresight and risk management areas.  It attempts to define a series of smaller, seemingly disconnected events that merge over time leading to a Wild Card-like result.

References
  Barber MP (2004, 2006) 'Wildcards – Signals from a Future near You'; Journal of future Studies Vol 11 No1; Tamkang University

Risk management